was the original league cup for clubs in the top levels of Japanese soccer before the creation of the J. League and its cup. The cup was first played in 1973, but did not become an annual tournament until 1976.

The JSL/JFL Cup included clubs from both the First Division and the Second Division. The format varied; sometimes the clubs played small group stages, other times it was an outright elimination, including only the clubs that were not recent promotions to the Second Division. During the season timeframe change of 1985, the cup was played within the year, a rule that stayed until the advent of the J. League.

Winners

Performances by team
Teams are named using current nomenclature, or last one if they are defunct (denoted in italics).

Sources
Contents of Domestic Competition of Football in Japan
Japan – List of League Cup Winners, RSSSF.com

 
Defunct football cup competitions in Japan
Cup
National association football league cups
Recurring sporting events established in 1973
Recurring sporting events disestablished in 1991
1973 establishments in Japan
1991 disestablishments in Japan